The Jean-Paul Sartre Experience, later renamed JPS Experience after the estate of Jean-Paul Sartre threatened a lawsuit, were an indie rock band on New Zealand's Flying Nun Records.

History
The band was formed in 1984 by Dave Yetton (vocals, bass guitar), Gary Sullivan (drums), and Dave Mulcahy (guitar). They were later joined by a second vocalist and guitarist, Jim Laing. 
Their first crudely recorded demo tape was supplied to university radio stations around the country in a can. It contained early versions of the songs "Einstein" and "Crap Rap" that would appear on subsequent releases. In 1986 they were asked to record a track for the "Weird Culture, Weird Custom" compilation produced by the student radio network. Their track was "Let That Good Thing Grow", which was re-released on their first album. They were subsequently signed by Flying Nun, who issued their eponymous début EP in January 1987, and début album Love Songs the same year, described by AllMusic as "an exceptional - if short - affair". After two further albums for the label, they added keyboard player Russell Baillie and abbreviated their name to the JPS experience after being threatened with legal action by Sartre's estate. After three EPs, Baillie departed in 1993, and the band released their fourth (and final) album, Bleeding Star, which took a noisier approach than their earlier recordings, drawing comparisons with Pixies and My Bloody Valentine. Mulcahy had left during the album's recording, forming Monster and later Superette and Eskimo, who released one album before shortening their name to Kimo. He was replaced by Matt Heine, formerly of Solid Gold Hell. The band continued until their split in 1994.

After the demise of JPS Experience, David Yetton recorded two albums with The Stereo Bus and one solo album, as well as playing with The Mutton Birds. James Laing released one solo album and Gary Sullivan performed on the first Stereo Bus album and on early Dimmer releases. Sullivan joined Solid Gold Hell. Jim Laing died on 12 April 2016 of natural causes. Before his death the band had been in talks to reunite and write new material. The band later played a one off-show, on 22 April 2016 at the newly refurbished Hollywood Theatre in Avondale to commemorate their friend and bandmate Jim Laing.

Discography

Albums

EPs

Compilations

Singles

Compilation appearances
The group have appeared on some compilations and soundtracks both in New Zealand and in Australia. The following is a list of these albums:
 (1999) - Scarfies (Flying Nun Records) - "Let There Be Love" & "Grey Parade"
 (1987) - Weird Culture, Weird Custom "Let That Good Thing Grow" National Student Radio

References

External links
[ AMG entry]
Jean-Paul Sartre Experience at Flying Nun
AudioCulture profile

Flying Nun Records artists
New Zealand indie rock groups
Dunedin Sound musical groups